Reuben Wu (born 1975) is a British artist, photographer, and musician. He is also known as a founding member of the electronic band Ladytron.

Biography
Reuben Wu was born in Liverpool in 1975, the son of Hongkonger immigrants. He trained in industrial design at Sheffield Hallam University, graduating in 1997. Meanwhile, he met Daniel Hunt in Liverpool in 1994; they formed Ladytron in 1999, along with Mira Aroyo and Helen Marnie. Wu finished his MSc in 1998 at the University of Liverpool. He worked as an industrial designer until going full-time with the band in 2002.

Wu and Hunt set up the Liverpool nightclubs Evol in 2003 and Korova in 2005.

Wu co-wrote and produced two songs "Birds of Prey" and "Little Dreamer" for Christina Aguilera's 2010 album Bionic.

Utilizing his skill an artist and designer, Wu illustrated the artwork of the UK edition of Ladytron's first album 604 and was introduced to photography by documenting his travels on tour with the band. His own visual art career began later in 2012 once the band took a sabbatical and he was able to focus full-time on his own creative output. Wu has since created artistic content for GE, Apple's Mac OS Big Sur wallpapers, Jaguar Land Rover, Google and Interscope amongst others.

In 2017, Wu photographed the artwork for Zedd and Alessia Cara's double platinum single "Stay" and Zedd & Liam Payne's single "Get Low" in collaboration with Samuel Burgess-Johnson.

Wu became a National Geographic photographer in 2022 after having his first assignment published in the magazine, a cover story on Stonehenge for the August issue. For this story, he used his unconventional drone lighting technique to illuminate the ancient megalith at night. In March 2023, the Stonehenge story won "Online Storytelling Project of the Year" in the Pictures of the Year International Competition, an annual contest for documentary photographers and photojournalists and part of Pictures of the Year International.

In March 2023, Wu announced his departure from Ladytron citing growing commitments to his photography and art career.

Instruments
During Ladytron's live shows, Reuben Wu plays synthesizers. Korg MS-10 was his primary synthesizer for the first four Ladytron tours.

Wu played live the following instruments for the band:
 Korg MS-10, Roland SH-2 (604 tour);
 Korg MS-10, microKorg (Light & Magic tour);
 Korg MS-10, Korg MS2000B (Witching Hour tour);
 Korg MS-10, Korg MS2000B, Minimoog Voyager (Velocifero tour);
 Minimoog Voyager (Best of 00-10 and Gravity the Seducer tours).

On the early part of the Witching Hour tour, Ladytron used to name their four identical Korg MS2000B to enable easier installation on stage. His MS2000B keyboard was named Gloria.

Discography

Ladytron

604 (2001)
Light & Magic (2002)
Witching Hour (2005)
Velocifero (2008)
Gravity the Seducer (2011)
Ladytron (2019)
Time's Arrow (2023)

References

External links
 Reuben Wu's Official Website
 Reuben Wu's Official Instagram
 Interview with The Photographic Journal
 National Geographic: Surreal Desert Landscapes Painted on a Canvas Made of Sky
 The Adventure Photography of Ladytron Co-Founder Reuben Wu
 
  ISO50 feature on Reuben Wu's photography

1975 births
Living people
Photographers from Liverpool
Musicians from Liverpool
Ladytron members
Electronic dance music DJs
English people of Hong Kong descent
Alumni of the University of Liverpool